Ptychogonimidae is a family of trematodes belonging to the order Plagiorchiida.

Genera:
 Melogonimus Bray, Brockerhoff & Cribb, 1995
 Ptychogonimus Lühe, 1900

References

Plagiorchiida